Hilton Julius Armstrong, Jr. (born November 11, 1984) is an American former professional basketball player and current member of the Golden State Warriors coaching staff who last played for the Nagoya Diamond Dolphins of the B.League. During his college basketball career, he played as a forward and center for the University of Connecticut Huskies. He formerly played for the New Orleans Hornets, Sacramento Kings, Houston Rockets, Washington Wizards, Atlanta Hawks, and Golden State Warriors of the NBA. He was also on the pre-season roster of the Indiana Pacers in 2014 and played in a summer league for the Los Angeles Clippers in 2012. Hilton Armstrong is currently married and is the father of four children.

College career
After graduating from Peekskill High School, Armstrong started off slowly as a college athlete, averaging under 4 points in each of first 3 seasons at UConn with the Huskies. However, he greatly improved in his senior year, averaging 9.7 points, 6.6 rebounds, and 3.1 blocks, and shooting 61% from the field. He followed after his teammate Josh Boone, and won the Big East Defensive Player of the Year award in the 2005–06 season.

Professional career

NBA (2006–2011)
He was declared eligible for the 2006 NBA draft, and was selected by the New Orleans Hornets with the 12th overall pick. Known for his shot-blocking and athleticism, he was anticipated by analysts to be an instant contributor to the Hornets front line, but the team then traded for the Chicago Bulls center Tyson Chandler. Chandler was named the starting center and Armstrong played a reserve role throughout his time with the Hornets.

On January 11, 2010, Armstrong was traded to the Sacramento Kings for a conditional 2016 second-round draft pick.

On February 18, 2010, Armstrong was traded to the Houston Rockets, along with Kevin Martin, for Carl Landry and Joey Dorsey. He was waived by the Rockets on April 10, 2010.

Armstrong signed with the Washington Wizards on July 13, 2010.

On February 23, 2011, Armstrong was traded to the Atlanta Hawks, along with Kirk Hinrich, in exchange for Mike Bibby, Jordan Crawford, Maurice Evans and a first-round pick in the 2011 NBA draft.

France (2011–2012)
In July 2011, Armstrong signed with ASVEL Basket of the French Pro A League. In 42 games played for ASVEL, he averaged 10.8 points and 6.7 rebounds per game.

Greece (2012)
In August 2012, he signed with Panathinaikos of the Greek Basketball League. In December 2012, he parted ways with Panathinaikos after appearing in 10 games.

D-League / Return to the NBA (2013–2014)
In January 2013, Armstrong was acquired by the Santa Cruz Warriors of the NBA D-League. He played very well for the Warriors, earning 2nd Team All D-League Defensive Team honors.

On September 27, 2013, he signed with the Indiana Pacers. However, he was waived on October 26.

In November 2013, he was re-acquired by the Santa Cruz Warriors.

On December 11, 2013, after playing in six games with Santa Cruz, Armstrong signed with the Golden State Warriors. On December 29, 2013, he was waived by Golden State. On January 3, 2014, he was re-acquired by Santa Cruz.

On February 3, 2014, Armstrong was named to the Futures All-Star roster for the 2014 NBA D-League All-Star Game.

On February 22, 2014, he signed a 10-day contract with the Golden State Warriors. On March 4, 2014, he returned to Santa Cruz after his 10-day contract expired. On March 30, 2014, he signed another 10-day contract with the Golden State Warriors. On April 9, 2014, he signed with Golden State for the rest of the 2013–14 season. He started the final game of the regular season and recorded a double-double. On July 30, 2014, he was waived by Golden State. While playing for Golden State, Armstrong became the first player in NBA history to wear jersey number 57.

Turkey (2014–2016)
On August 6, 2014, he signed a one-year deal with Turkish team Beşiktaş of the Turkish Basketball Super League. On May 5, 2015, Armstrong recorded a career-high 30 points, shooting 10-of-14 from the field, along with nine rebounds, three assists and three steals in a 74–94 blowout loss to Fenerbahçe.

On July 30, 2015, he signed with Tüyap Büyükçekmece also of Turkey. However, on November 10, 2015, he parted ways with Büyükçekmece and joined Denizli Basket of the Turkish Basketball First League for the rest of the season.

Japan (2016–2018)
On August 5, 2016, he signed with the Japanese team Chiba Jets of the B.League. In 60 games played for the Jets, Armstrong averaged 10.2 points, 7.7 rebounds, 1.6 assists and 1.4 blocks per game.

On July 28, 2017, he signed with the Ryukyu Golden Kings for the 2017–18 season.

Israel (2018–2019)
On August 16, 2018, he signed a one-year deal with the Israeli team Bnei Herzliya, joining his former teammate Jeff Adrien. However, on January 10, 2019, Armstrong parted ways with Herzliya after appearing in 13 games.

Return to Japan (2019–present)
On January 25, 2019, he returned to Japan for a second stint, joining the Nagoya Diamond Dolphins for the rest of the season.

Acting career
Armstrong appeared as himself in the 2015 independent film Four Square Miles to Glory.

Career statistics

NBA

Regular season

|-
| align="left" | 
| align="left" | New Orleans/Oklahoma City
| 56 || 5 || 11.3 || .544 || .000 || .597 || 2.7 || .2 || .2 || .5 || 3.1
|-
| align="left" | 
| align="left" | New Orleans
| 65 || 3 || 11.3 || .453 || .000 || .629 || 2.5 || .4 || .2 || .5 || 2.7
|-
| align="left" | 
| align="left" | New Orleans
| 70 || 29 || 15.6 || .561 || .000 || .633 || 2.8 || .4 || .4 || .6 || 4.8
|-
| align="left" | 
| align="left" | New Orleans
| 18 || 0 || 13.3 || .380 || .000 || .464 || 3.4 || .9 || .4 || .4 || 2.8
|-
| align="left" | 
| align="left" | Sacramento
| 6 || 0 || 9.3 || .333 || .000 || 1.000 || 2.3 || .3 || .3 || .7 || 1.7
|-
| align="left" | 
| align="left" | Houston
| 9 || 0 || 4.4 || .294 || .000 || .000 || .7 || .3 || .6 || .0 || 1.1
|-
| align="left" | 
| align="left" | Washington
| 41 || 2 || 10.0 || .484 || .333 || .609 || 2.8 || .2 || .4 || .4 || 1.9
|-
| align="left" | 
| align="left" | Atlanta
| 12 || 0 || 6.3 || .500 || 1.000 || .200 || 1.4 || .3 || .3 || .4 || 1.3
|-
| align="left" | 
| align="left" | Golden State
| 15 || 1 || 6.5 || .474 || .000 || .438 || 3.1 || .3 || .3 || .3 || 1.7
|-
| align="center" colspan="2" | Career
| 292 || 40 || 11.6 || .501 || .286 || .582 || 2.6 || .3 || .3 || .5 || 3.0

Playoffs

|-
| align="left" | 2008
| align="left" | New Orleans
| 8 || 0 || 9.0 || .615 || .000 || .500 || 2.5 || .0 || .0 || .8 || 2.6
|-
| align="left" | 2009
| align="left" | New Orleans
| 4 || 1 || 13.3 || .462 || .000 || .300 || 2.0 || .3 || 1.0 || .3 || 3.8
|-
| align="left" | 2011
| align="left" | Atlanta
| 8 || 0 || 4.4 || .200 || .000 || .500 || 1.9 || .1 || .4 || .0 || .6
|-
| align="left" | 2014
| align="left" | Golden State
| 7 || 0 || 2.4 || .500 || .000 || .000 || .6 || .3 || .0 || .3 || 1.1
|-
| align="center" colspan="2" | Career
| 27 || 1 || 6.6 || .487 || .000 || .393 || 1.6 || .1 || .3 || .3 || 1.8

NBA D-League

Regular season

|-
| align="left" | 2012–13
| align="left" | Santa Cruz
| 29 || 24 || 26.3 || .628 || .000 || .694 || 6.8 || .8 || 1.0 || 2.2 || 13.4
|-
| align="left" | 2013–14
| align="left" | Santa Cruz
| 32 || 23 || 26.2 || .559 || .333 || .743 || 7.4 || 1.9 || .7 || 1.8 || 12.0
|-
| align="center" colspan="2" | Career
| 61 || 47 || 26.3 || .592 || .333 || .718 || 7.1 || 1.4 || .8 || 2.0 || 12.7
|-
| align="center" colspan="2" | All-Star
| 1 || 0 || 19.0 || .625 || .000 || .000 || 8.0 || 1.0 || .0 || 1.0 || 10.0

Playoffs

|-
| align="left" | 2013
| align="left" | Santa Cruz
| 6 || 6 || 23.2 || .667 || .000 || .531 || 5.5 || 1.0 || 1.2 || 2.3 || 10.2
|-
| align="center" colspan="2" | Career
| 6 || 6 || 23.2 || .667 || .000 || .531 || 5.5 || 1.0 || 1.2 || 2.3 || 10.2

College

|-
| align="left" | 2002–03
| align="left" | Connecticut Huskies
| 32 || 22 || 10.8 || .545 || .000 || .500 || 2.8 || .7 || .2 || .7 || 2.8
|-
| align="left" | 2003–04
| align="left" | Connecticut Huskies
| 35 || 1 || 9.1 || .500 || .000 || .388 || 2.8 || .3 || .1 || .7 || 2.4
|-
| align="left" | 2004–05
| align="left" | Connecticut Huskies
| 30 || 0 || 12.4 || .519 || .000 || .525 || 3.4 || .6 || .3 || 1.2 || 3.8
|-
| align="left" | 2005–06
| align="left" | Connecticut Huskies
| 34 || 33 || 27.7 || .608 || .500 || .692 || 6.6 || .7 || .6 || 3.1 || 9.7
|-
| align="center" colspan="2" | Career
| 131 || 56 || 15.1 || .563 || .333 || .578 || 3.9 || .6 || .3 || 1.4 || 4.7

Notes

References

External links
 
 DraftExpress.com Profile
 FIBA.com Profile
 ESPN.com Profile
 

1984 births
Living people
American expatriate basketball people in France
American expatriate basketball people in Greece
American expatriate basketball people in Israel
American expatriate basketball people in Japan
American expatriate basketball people in Turkey
American men's basketball players
ASVEL Basket players
Atlanta Hawks players
Basketball players from New York (state)
Beşiktaş men's basketball players
Bnei Hertzeliya basketball players
Büyükçekmece Basketbol players
Centers (basketball)
Chiba Jets Funabashi players
Golden State Warriors players
Houston Rockets players
Nagoya Diamond Dolphins players
New Orleans Hornets draft picks
New Orleans Hornets players
Panathinaikos B.C. players
People from Peekskill, New York
Power forwards (basketball)
Ryukyu Golden Kings players
Sacramento Kings players
Santa Cruz Warriors players
Sportspeople from Westchester County, New York
UConn Huskies men's basketball players
Washington Wizards players